Legnago is a town and comune in the Province of Verona, Veneto, northern Italy, with population (2012) of 25,439. Its fertile land produces crops of rice, other cereals, sugar, and tobacco.

History
Traces of human presence in the area date back to the Bronze Age.

Legnago had an important military role since the early Middle Ages. In the 19th century it was one of the Quadrilatero fortresses, the main strongpoint of the Austrian Lombardy-Venetia puppet state during the Italian Wars of Independence. The present fortifications were planned and made in 1815, the older defences having been destroyed by Napoleon I in 1801.

Geography
Located in the southwestern corner of its province, near the borders with the ones of Rovigo, Padua and Vicenza, Legnago borders with the municipalities of Angiari, Bergantino (RO), Bonavigo, Boschi Sant'Anna, Castelnovo Bariano (RO), Cerea, Minerbe, Terrazzo and Villa Bartolomea. It counts the hamlets (frazioni) of Canove, Casette, Porto, San Pietro, San Vito, Terranegra, Torretta, Vangadizza and Vigo.

Main sights
Church of San Salvaro (12th century).
Cathedral (Duomo), from the 18th century.
The Torrione ("Grand Tower"), dating from the 14th century, the only surviving tower from the old medieval walls.

Culture 
In honour of Legnago's most famous native, the composer Antonio Salieri, there is a Salieri Opera Festival every autumn sponsored by the Fondazione Culturale Antonio Salieri and dedicated to rediscovering his work and those of his contemporaries. A theatre in Legnago has also been renamed in his honour.

People
Antonio Salieri (1750-1825), composer
Giovanni Battista Cavalcaselle (1827-1897), art historian
Apollo Granforte (1886-1975), operatic baritone

Sport
The local football club is the F.C. Legnago Salus S.S.D.

References

Sources

External links

Official website 

Cities and towns in Veneto